Vladimir Ricardino Carval Jeronimo (born 4 October 1978), known as Vladimir Ricardino or Vladimir Jeronimo, is an Angolan basketball player and a former member of the Angola national basketball team. He competed for Angola at the 2008 Summer Olympics.

He is currently playing for Petro Atlético at the Angolan major basketball league BAI Basket.

References

External links
 

1978 births
Living people
People from Benguela
Angolan men's basketball players
Basketball players at the 2008 Summer Olympics
Olympic basketball players of Angola
Power forwards (basketball)
Centers (basketball)
Atlético Petróleos de Luanda basketball players
Atlético Sport Aviação basketball players
C.D. Primeiro de Agosto men's basketball players
C.R.D. Libolo basketball players
African Games gold medalists for Angola
African Games medalists in basketball
2010 FIBA World Championship players
Competitors at the 2007 All-Africa Games